Shargʻun is a city in Surxondaryo Region, Uzbekistan. It is part of Sariosiyo District. The town population was 10,716 people in 1989, and 11,400 in 2016.

References

Populated places in Surxondaryo Region
Cities in Uzbekistan